Victor Beaumont (born Peter Wolff; 7 November 1912 – 21 March 1977) was a German-born British film and television actor.

Biography
Beaumont billed under his birth name of Peter Wolff, appeared in a number of German films (Revolt in the Reform School, Der brave Suender etc.) and at least one play (Die erste Mrs Selby). After emigrating to the United Kingdom in the 1930s, he appeared in British films and television dramas from the 1940s and Hollywood films from the 1960s. He is perhaps best known for his portrayals of Nazi German characters in films such as Where Eagles Dare (1968) in which he played Colonel Weissner, Carve Her Name with Pride (1958), The Guns of Navarone (1961), The Heroes of Telemark (1965) and Willy Wonka & the Chocolate Factory (1971) in the uncredited role of the psychologist.

His television appearances included two episodes of The Saint and a cameo appearance in the opening episode, 'Departure and Arrival', as Dr. Hauser in the short-lived, six-episode BBC sci-fi drama series Moonbase 3 (1973).

Beaumont died on 21 March 1977, aged 64.

Selected filmography

 The Next of Kin (1942) as German Colonel (uncredited)
 The First of the Few (1942) as Von Crantz
 Thunder Rock (1942) as  Hans (uncredited)
 Tomorrow We Live (1943) as Rabineau
 We Dive at Dawn (1943) as German Airman (uncredited)
 Reach for the Sky (1956) as German Doctor (uncredited)
 Man from Tangier (1957) as Film Director (uncredited)
 Carve Her Name with Pride (1958) as German Colonel (uncredited)
 I Was Monty's Double (1958) as Gottmann (Commando)
 Mark of the Phoenix (1958) as Travel Clerk
 The Square Peg (1958) as Lt. Jogenkraut
 Sink the Bismarck! (1960) as Officer on the 'Bismarck' (uncredited)
 The Criminal (1960) as 2nd Man at Party (uncredited)
 Shoot to Kill (1960) as Nauman
 The Guns of Navarone (1961) as German Officer in Gun Cave (uncredited)
 The Night We Dropped a Clanger (1961) as Factory Commandant
 Freud: The Secret Passion (1962) as Dr. Guber
 The Password Is Courage (1962) as German Officer in Retreating Column (uncredited)
 Master Spy (1963) as Petrov
 Jeff Gordon, Secret Agent (1963) as Grégori
 The Bay of St. Michel (1963) as Man
 A Shot in the Dark (1964) as Gendarme
 The Train (1964) (uncredited)
 The Heroes of Telemark (1965) as German Sergeant
 Thunderball (1965) as SPECTRE No. 3 (uncredited)
 The Quiller Memorandum (1966) as Weiss, Bowling Alley Manager (uncredited)
 Frozen Flashes (1966) as Chief of British Secret Service
 The Night of the Generals (1967) as SS Officer (uncredited)
 Attack on the Iron Coast (1968) as German Battery Commander (uncredited)
 Where Eagles Dare (1968) as Col. Weissner
 The Assassination Bureau (1969) as von Pinck's Aide (uncredited)
 The Kremlin Letter (1970) as The Dentist
 Willy Wonka & the Chocolate Factory (1971) as Doctor (uncredited)

References

External links
 

1912 births
1977 deaths
British male film actors
British male television actors
German emigrants to the United Kingdom
20th-century British male actors
Male actors from Berlin